Harold Mason was a politician.

Harold Mason may also refer to:

Harold Andrew Mason, English academic and editor
Harold Mason, founder of Greenwood Publishing Group
Harold L. Mason of the Mason family

See also
Hal Mason (disambiguation)
Harry Mason (disambiguation)
Brian Harold Mason